A Ticker tape was the earliest electrical dedicated financial communications medium, transmitting stock price information over telegraph lines.

Ticker tape may refer to:
News ticker, also referred to as "ticker tape"
Ticker Tape (record label), a record label founded in 2011 by the English band Radiohead
Ticker Tape (Gorillaz song), a track on the album Humanz by the British virtual band Gorillaz

See also
Ticker tape parade, a celebratory parade